The 1993 British Formula Two Championship was the fifth season of the British Formula 3000 Championship. The series was won by the Belgian driver Philippe Adams, later to make an unsuccessful F1 debut by buying a drive at Team Lotus. He drove for both Madgwick International and Argo Cars during the year, taking five wins including the first four races. British F2 had by this stage become seriously devalued with tiny grids. Another Belgian, Madgwick's Mikke van Hool, shared the runner-up spot with the Team AJS's José Luis Di Palma. With three and two wins apiece, the two runners-up ensured no-one else stepped on the top step of the podium. Nigel Smith, driving a full season for Jupiter Racing, was fourth overall and best of the Brits. Other drivers racing included sometime F1 driver Enrico Bertaggia and future IndyCar and IRL driver Stéphan Grégoire.

Drivers and teams
The following drivers and teams contested the 1993 British Formula Two Championship.

Results

British Formula Two Championship

Championship Standings

References

Formula 3000
British Formula 3000 Championship